This page documents all tornadoes confirmed by various weather forecast offices of the National Weather Service in the United States in November 2017. Tornado counts are considered preliminary until final publication in the database of the National Centers for Environmental Information.

United States yearly total

November

November 5 event

November 17 event

November 18 event

November 22 event

December

December 4 event

December 19 event

December 20 event

See also
 Tornadoes of 2017
 List of United States tornadoes from August to October 2017
 List of United States tornadoes from January to March 2018

Notes

References

2017 natural disasters in the United States
2017-related lists
Tornadoes of 2017
Tornadoes
2017, 11